The Berkshire Conference of Women Historians Book Prizes are awarded each year by the Berkshire Conference of Women Historians.  Nominees must be women normally resident in North America who have published a book in the previous year.  One prize recognizes an author's first book that "deals substantially with the history of women, gender, and/or sexuality", and the other prize recognizes "a first book in any field of history that does not focus on the history of women, gender, and/or sexuality."

Winners

See also
 List of history awards

References

External links 
 Winners of the Berkshire Conference of Women Historians Book Prize

Awards established in 1990
History awards
American non-fiction literary awards
Awards honoring women